Liew Kit Kong (born 6 January 1979) is a Malaysian footballer who last played as a striker for PKNS F.C. He was also a former member of the Malaysian national team.

Early life
Kit Kong was born in Perak and is of mixed Chinese and Indian heritage.

Career
He won the Best Striker award for the 2007-08 FAM Football Awards ahead of two other nominees: Mohd Safee Mohd Sali and Mohd Zaquan Adha Abdul Radzak, despite playing in the second division, the Malaysia Premier League. In that season, he became the top local goal scorer in the Premier League with 16 goals.

Liew has represented the national side since 2002 when he was call up for an international friendly match against five times World Cup winners Brazil. He was selected as one of first eleven to played against Brazilian stars such as Ronaldo and Barca's Ronaldinho. He also played in third place play-off 2004 AFF Championship and part of the squad in 2005 Islamic Solidarity Games when the national team reached quarter-final.

Career statistics

International goals

Honours
Perak
 Malaysia Cup: 2000
 Malaysia FA Cup: 2004

Kedah
Liga Perdana 2: 2002

Kuala Muda Naza FC
Malaysia Premier League: 2007/08

Selangor
Malaysia Super League: 2010
Malaysia Charity Shield: 2010

References

External links
 Liew Kit Kong - Linkedin
 

1979 births
Living people
People from Perak
Malaysian sportspeople of Chinese descent
Malaysian sportspeople of Indian descent
Malaysian footballers
Malaysia international footballers
Kuala Muda Naza F.C. players
Negeri Sembilan FA players
Perak F.C. players
Kedah Darul Aman F.C. players
Selangor FA players
Terengganu FC players
Sabah F.C. (Malaysia) players
Association football forwards